Training raptors (birds of prey) is a complex undertaking. Books containing advice by experienced falconers are still rudimentary at best.
Many important details vary between individual raptors, species of raptors and between places and times. The keeping and training of any raptor is strictly and tightly regulated by U.S. state and federal laws. Anyone in the USA who is interested in flying raptors must seek out a state and federally licensed falconer to sponsor them through an apprenticeship period lasting two years at a minimum, and often considerably longer.

Equipment

The bird wears:
 A hood, which is used in the manning process (acclimatising to humans and the human world) and to keep the raptor in a calm state, both in the early part of its training and throughout its falconry career. Out of all the falconer's aids the hood is the most important piece of equipment. There are various styles and types of hood for raptors within falconry. The hood is handmade, often from kip leather or suitable kangaroo leather. There are two standard types used in American/European falconry: the Anglo Indian hood (non-blocked) and the Dutch hood. The Anglo-Indian hood is made from one piece of leather. The Dutch hood is a three piece hood blocked on a special mould called a "hood block", which is designed to best represent the shape of the raptor's head, also allowing space for the eyes with an adequate neck width. It is essential that the hood fits the raptor in a comfortable way or the raptor will reject the hood outright, making training very difficult.
 A bell, or pair of bells, on its legs (attached via small leather strips called bewits), which can be heard from a fair distance.
 An identity band on the leg, in most countries.

 Strips of strong leather (nowadays often kangaroo) called jesses on both legs.
 Very often, a telemetry transmitter, so that it may be recovered if lost during free flight.
Falcons (the long-wing family of raptors) are tethered perched on a block; large owls (during training only) and short-winged and broad-winged hawks are tethered to a bow perch or round perch, when not allowed to fly free in their mews, an Old English word for a raptor's chamber.  (The term is "mews" whether singular or plural; the word "mews" came from French muer which means "to change" or "to molt", i.e. where the hawk was kept while it was molting.)

Jesses

There are three styles of jesses: traditional, which is a single strap specially knotted onto the bird; and Aylmeri, a two part restraint featuring an anklet that is grommeted on, and a removable jess strap. Some Aylmeri jess straps have dental rubber bands on them to make it more difficult for the bird to pull out the jess, but they are still removable if the bird gets caught up outdoors. The third type of jesses is a combination of the two, referred to as "false Aylmeri." These use an anklet as well, but a brass eyelet is slipped through, far enough away that the toes will not get caught in it. There are two straps attached to the anklet, flying jesses and mews jesses. Both can be removed. A good reference on these jesses is "Care And Management of Captive Raptors" by Lori Arent & Mark Martell, published by the University of Minnesota: this guide is very popular with zoos and wildlife centers, though it is not a traditional falconry book.

The singular of "jesses" is correctly "jess", but one jess is often mistakenly called a "jessie", by wrong back-formation from "jesses" treated as "jessies", which would be pronounced the same.

Nylon Aylmeri jesses have recently grown in popularity. Thinner, lighter, and stronger, they do not rot or need oiling to stay supple. The anklets are grommetted on, like their leather counterparts, but instead of a folded button keeping the straps from falling through the anklets, a knot is used.  The end of the knot is melted with a cigarette lighter to keep it from fraying. In order to form the loops the swivel or clips will attach to, a nylon parachute cord is hollowed out, threaded up through itself using an awl, and knotted.

The swivel is to prevent tangling and twisting of the leash or tether when the bird is active but not hunting. The swivel consists of two parts that twist freely, each with a metal hoop on the end.  The swivel may be traditional, or modified.  The modified swivel has much larger metal hoops than the traditional. While swivels have been made of cloth or other materials in the past, most modern falconers use metal swivels. See Falconer's knot for more information about tying off the bird to the glove?

When using Aylmeri jesses, there are usually two sets of straps; the mews strap, for manning and tethering the bird, and flying straps. The flying straps are lighter and smaller for hunting; the mews straps are heavy and less likely to break with stress.

Most importantly, hunting/flying jesses do not have the slit which can often get caught on a branch or bush, leaving the bird hanging too high up in the tree to be retrieved. Since using mews jesses in the field is dangerous to the bird, educated falconers no longer risk them. Instead, they are changed out before the bird is released to fly free, and the mews jesses returned into the grommets after the free-flight is over and the bird is safely in hand.

Jesses and anklets need to be replaced periodically, and checked for fit if they are causing injury.

Scale

A weighing scale is used to weigh the bird and its food. The scale must be reliable. This is especially important when dealing with small birds, as they may be endangered by even small weight differences when at flying weight.  The successful hunting weight of the bird may vary, usually increasing as the bird is flown and develops more muscle (which weighs more than fat), but there is a relatively narrow range which the falconer seeks.  Below that weight, the bird will be unnecessarily (and perhaps even dangerously) low and weak. Even the jesses lying on the scale can change the reading, so the falconer has to be careful to lift them up while the bird is being weighed.  Above that range of weight, the bird will be unresponsive in the field, lacking in motivation to hunt or return to the falconer in timely fashion.

Gauntlets

Gauntlets or gloves are used by the falconer to turn the arm into a suitable perching surface. Falconry gloves may only cover the fist and wrist, while gauntlets for larger species extend to the elbow.  An eagle glove may cover the entire arm and a portion of the chest, or it may be a heavy sheath worn over a standard hawking glove.  The glove will have to be replaced with wear.

Creance

A creance is a long light line which is tied to the swivel or jesses. This is used only when training the bird to fly between a perch and the fist, as an assurance that the bird will not be lost in these early stages. The end away from the bird is most often wound around the spindle like a kite string; the creance can be wound or unwound with a single hand.  This provides a means of storing the creance, and also provides a drag weight if the bird decides to fly off.

Housing
A falconry bird is usually housed in a mew. Mews in the US have to be inspected for compliance with federal and state laws. These laws ensure that the facilities meet what is required to safely and humanely house a bird of prey. The mews (along with other perching equipment) are carefully designed to prevent bodily injury and especially feather damage.  The laws and regulations generally prescribe characteristics that would allow a captive raptor some measure of security and health maintenance in the absence of an attentive experienced falconer.  The mews may be used as a free-flight arrangement (especially during the summer molt or change of feathers) or it may provide a place for tethering the raptor during the night—during the day, when not actually hunting, the bird might be kept perched on a grassy lawn. Much depends on the species of raptor, the housing of the falconer, the weather, and the style of keeping, training and hunting. The less a bird is hunted, the more important the mews and domestic quarters. A falconer who likes to hunt with passage Cooper's hawks (an American Accipiter) just for one season then release them may be content to use a spare bedroom of his/her apartment, if permitted by the state wildlife agency. Another who desires an eyass female peregrine falcon for hunting ducks on ponds and later hopes that she will lay eggs for captive breeding (long relationship, special considerations), will probably want a large special outdoor building.

In the UK the only law concerned requires the bird to be able to spread its wings in all directions, however in practice a much greater space is needed to avoid conditions such as bumblefoot and depression. This lack of laws in the UK is the source of much concern among raptor keepers.

Diet

There are different schools of thought when it comes to feeding falconry birds. Some falconers feed meat based on its nutritional value to control how hungry the bird is.  If pure meat is fed, falconers must feed additional roughage, such as fur and feathers, as most raptors require them to digest properly. Roughage cleans out the crop, and is regurgitated in a football shaped pellet called a casting. Alternatively, falconers feed their birds whole food such as mouse or quail, reducing the need for supplements and additional roughage. All birds of prey eat a strictly carnivorous diet.

In all cases, a bird's diet is carefully measured to control its weight.  Weight determines how hungry the bird is and how lazy it will act.  A bird that is overweight will be more likely to fly away or not hunt.  A bird that is somewhat underweight will act aggressively, and a bird that is severely underweight will have health problems.

Manning
Manning is an essential part of falconry training that refers to the acclimation of a falconry bird to living and working with humans and things typically associated with humans, such as other pets, houses, or automobiles. The better manned a falconry bird is, the more calm and less likely it will be to engage in a fight or flight response  around people.

Wild-caught birds
A wild bird in juvenile plumage is called a passager, meaning it is under a year old. When a wild bird is used in falconry, passage birds are preferred. Since many of these birds would otherwise die (estimates run from 30 to 70 percent) within their first year, the taking of juvenile hawks by falconers has no noticeable effect on raptor populations. Baited traps used for hawks are unlike typical hunting traps in that they are specifically designed to avoid harming the hawk.

Birds that are in adult plumage are called haggards and are no longer commonly used in falconry. The reason for this is twofold: first, birds that have matured in the wild are considerably harder to train for return (when released for hunting haggards have a tendency to go off hunting on their own and are easily lost); second, the capture of an adult bird removes a breeding age bird from the local pool of viable adults.

Taking a bird from the wild is illegal in the UK, as is releasing a captive bred bird. In America, trapping or attempting to trap any native species of raptor is a federal crime unless the person doing the trapping is licensed. A falconry permit allows a falconer to trap certain birds at certain times of the year.

Imprinted versus non-imprinted captive-bred birds
A falconry bird taken from the nest as a downy bird still unable to fly (a fledgling) is called an 'eyass' (by misdivision of French un niais from Latin nidiscus, from Latin nidus = "nest"). In addition to wild-taken eyass hawks, all captive bred hawks taken at this same stage are properly referred to as 'captive-bred eyass' hawks. Eyass hawks can be the best or the worst of the hawks - they will never learn to fear their trainer as the passager or the haggard bird would, and are therefore difficult to lose; but likewise from this very lack of fear they may never learn 'respect' for the falconer. This results in eyass hawks sometimes becoming 'food-aggressive', constantly screaming for food or attention or being unnecessarily 'footy' (to grab aggressively at the falconer). Vigilant care regimes must be followed to prevent these bad behaviours in the eyass hawk.

Today experienced falconers know how to rear an imprint so that it has few or none of these undesirable behaviors, but it is time-consuming and requires unswerving dedication for a period of about three months. During that time, the eyass is not allowed to ever become truly hungry, and in nearly constant company and visual range of human beings, so that the arrival of food is not specifically associated with the arrival of humans.  This bird is still very much imprinted on humans, but not food-imprinted, so the human is not considered something to be screamed at or attacked when hungry. In order to further assure that such correlations are not made, when it becomes ambulatory, some will take the bird to a separate room/area and allow it to "find" a plate of food, rather than having that food delivered to its face for it, as a parent bird would do.  Finally, the young eyass is allowed to wander about at Tame Hack and enjoy more autonomy than would be possible with a chamber or parent-reared bird (owing to that the bird's affinity towards humans will keep it relatively close by, an affinity lacking in the chamber/parent reared eyass.)  This provides the imprint eyass with an opportunity to learn to use its wings and develop musculature as well as the ability to fly in adverse conditions—advantages that the chamber-raised bird does not have.

In the United States, the law requires that all hybrid raptors must be either imprinted or sterilized before they can be free-flown.

Telemetry

In order to track a raptor that has flown away, many falconers use radio telemetry.  Typically a transmitter is temporarily attached to the leg at the jess or on a bewit.  Sometimes a mount for it may be attached to one of the center tail feathers by very careful application of a small drop of Superglue.  Recently, a lightweight harness made of Teflon tape has also been employed as a means of hanging the transmitter off the middle of the bird's back (out of the way of the bird's flight and footing, so as to minimize interference with the hunt.)  The transmitter emits a radio beep, which the falconer can track with a portable receiver.  By listening to how the signal gains or loses strength a practised person can gauge if the bird is sitting still, if it is flying, and what direction it is going in.  Practice with telemetry is very important, as there is no time for learning when a falcon is flying away.

Pitfalls
Many people who have not trained under a truly qualified master falconer have the impression that falconry is easy, simply fun and is an excuse to live with wild animals.  The hunting partnership between a falconer and his bird is not at all like keeping a pet or a wild animal collection.  Most falconers only have one or two birds, as they each require much effort. Websites or blogs featuring uninformed individuals buying several newly fledged captive bred hawks and then turning them outside to "hunt" are as far from the sport of falconry as can be imagined.

Weight is key, especially in small species. Some falconers do not recommend that beginners start with a kestrel, a tiny species of falcon.  They are ready sparrow hunters, and as they are so small one must pay close attention to their weight and training to avoid hurting them.  Similarly, some falconers agree that the use of Harris's hawks by beginners is best as the birds are so forgiving that the novice falconer can make constant mistakes in the bird's care and still hunt successfully. If the bird is a non-imprinted captive-bred, it is very important to establish in the bird's mind that the falconer will facilitate hunting, and thus food. The bird will be getting accustomed to its new 'furniture' (equipment) as well as its new owner.

Since the success of the Harry Potter series, some novices are desperate to keep (or hunt with) an owl.  Seldom does this lead to success.  Many states in the U.S. provide for keeping a great horned owl for hunting, but it is a difficult venture. Owls can be extremely difficult to hunt with, as they find prey more by hearing than their diurnal (daytime) counterparts.  Even the great horned owls and eagle owls, which can see well enough during the day, will still prefer hunting at night.

There is also greater risk to the owl when it is out during the daytime.  All of the diurnal raptors see owls as mortal enemies in competition with them for food and territory.  Accordingly, wild birds of prey will attack an owl mercilessly if given the opportunity, even killing it if they're able to do so.

Laws also carefully regulate falconry in many areas. Throughout the United States, for example, the falconer will be required to pass a written exam, build facilities, have them inspected, serve a two-year apprenticeship, and keep diligent records on his or her birds.  In order to catch a wild bird, the falconer may need additional licensing and permission.

Contacting a local falconry club or association is usually the first step to learning.

Notes
With the exception of Alaska, where goshawks are allowed (because they are plentiful in that far northern state), state laws often restrict apprentices to red-tailed hawks and kestrels. These restrictions may not apply to the keeping of raptors for purposes other than hunting (such as wildlife rehabilitation), but such activities are not considered falconry.

See also 

Hack (falconry)

References

Suggested reading and sources
Beatriz E. Candil, Arjen E.Hartman, Ars Accipitraria: An Essential Dictionary for the Practice of Falconry and hawking"; Yarak Publishing, London, 2007, 
 "North American Falconry And Hunting Hawks" by Hal Webster and Frank Beebe
 Care And Management Of Captive Raptors, Arent & Martell, University of Minnesota's Raptor Center
 Understanding the Bird of Prey, Nick Fox, Hancock House
 Falconry and Hawking, Phillip Glasier, Bastford,

External links 
North American Falconers' Exchange-Falconry Forum
 IAF - International Association for Falconry and Conservation of Birds of Prey, founded in 1968, is currently representing 75 falconry clubs and conservation organisations from 50 countries worldwide totalling over 30,000 members.